Leucopogon darlingensis is a species of flowering plant in the heath family Ericaceae and is endemic to the south-west of Western Australia. It is an erect shrub with hairy young branchlets, spirally arranged, linear, oblong, narrowly elliptic or narrowly egg-shaped leaves and white, bell-shaped flowers arranged in upper leaf axils and at the ends of branches.

Description

Taxonomy and naming
Leucopogon darlingensis was first formally described in 2014 by Michael Clyde Hislop in the journal Nuytsia from specimens collected by Fred and Jean Hort near Brookton in 2005. The specific epithet (darlingensis) is a reference to the species' occurrence in the Darling Range.

In the same publication, Hislop described two subspecies, and the names are accepted by the Australian Plant Census:

Distribution and habitat
This leucopogon grows in woodland on the Darling Range. Subspecies darlingensis occurs on the eastern part of the range, from near York to North Bannister and Wandering in the Avon Wheatbelt and Jarrah Forest bioregions of south-western Western Australia. Subspecies rectus has a more restricted distribution between Williams, the Dryandra Woodland and Highbury in the Avon Wheatbelt and Jarrah Forest bioregions.

Conservation status
Leucopogon darlingensis subsp. darlingensis is classified as "not threatened" by the Western Australian Government Department of Biodiversity, Conservation and Attractions but subsp. rectus is classified as "Priority Two", meaning that it is poorly known and from only one or a few locations.

References

darlingensis
Ericales of Australia
Flora of Western Australia
Plants described in 2014